Randolph–Macon College is a private liberal arts college in Ashland, Virginia. Founded in 1830, the college has an enrollment of more than 1,500 students. It is the second-oldest Methodist-run college in the country, and the oldest in continuous operation. The college primarily offers bachelor's degrees.

History 
Randolph–Macon was founded in 1830 by Methodists Rev. Hekeziah G. Leigh, Rev. John Early and Staten Islander Gabriel Poillon Disosway. It was originally located in Boydton, near the North Carolina border; but as the railroad link to Boydton was destroyed during the Civil War, the college's trustees decided to relocate the school to Ashland in 1868. The college takes its name from Virginia statesmen John Randolph of Roanoke and North Carolina statesman Nathaniel Macon. (The original site of Randolph–Macon features a historical marker and ruins of the classroom buildings). The original campus became the home of the Boydton Academic and Bible Institute, a Christian school for African Americans which operated from 1878 to 1935.  

In 1847, Randolph–Macon College established a relationship with Hampden–Sydney College. The relationship led to the formation of the Randolph–Macon Medical School, which closed in 1851. Its president William A. Smith delivered a set of lectures advocating slavery in 1856 and 1857.

The college has a historical relationship with Randolph College (formerly known as Randolph–Macon Woman's College) in Lynchburg, Virginia. The former women's college was founded under Randolph–Macon's original charter in 1893 by the then-president William Waugh Smith; it was intended as a female counterpart to the then all-male Randolph–Macon. The two schools later separated to become distinct institutions governed by two separate boards.  Randolph–Macon College became co-educational in 1971 with the enrollment of 50 women and the first full-time female faculty member.  (Randolph College became co-educational in 2007.)

In 1892, two preparatory schools — both called Randolph–Macon Academy — were founded. The only one that remains today is Randolph–Macon Academy in Front Royal, Virginia. Randolph–Macon Academy is today the only co-educational military boarding school in the country affiliated with the United States Air Force Air Force Junior Reserve Officer Training Corps (AFJROTC). Currently, there are no formal relationships or agreements between Randolph-Macon Academy and Randolph–Macon College aside from the shared names, mascots, and school colors.

Randolph–Macon College became the first college south of the Mason–Dixon line to require physical education coursework for graduation. The old gym, built in 1887, was the first structure in the South to be constructed solely for instruction in physical education.  Randolph–Macon is considered to be the first college in the South to offer English as a full discipline and to develop biology as a distinct study.  Its computer science department is one of the oldest in the country associated with a liberal arts school; in the 1960s, when the program was established, many academics believed computer science to be more appropriate for a commercial trade or secretarial school than a traditional four-year institution.

Since 1923, the college has been home to the Zeta of Virginia chapter of the Phi Beta Kappa Society, the nation's oldest academic honor society. Chi Beta Phi, the national science honorary society, was founded at Randolph–Macon in 1916.

Academics 
As of 2021, Randolph–Macon offers two undergraduate degrees: the Bachelor of Arts and the Bachelor of Science.  All students must satisfy the general collegiate curriculum, which requires them to take courses in each of the college's "Areas of Knowledge:" civilizations, arts and literature, natural and social sciences, mathematics, foreign languages, and wellness. Its most majors, based on 2021 graduates, were:

Business/Commerce (63)
Biology/Biological Sciences (49)
Communication (31)
Psychology (26)
Political Science and Government (18)

The college currently offers bachelor's degrees, though the institution has announced plans to provide a Master of Science in physician's assistant studies with the first cohort of students entering in 2021–2022.

The student-faculty ratio is 12:1.

Calendar 
Randolph–Macon operates on a 4-1-4 academic calendar. This allows for two four-month semesters (fall and spring) with a one-month term in January to split up the semesters. During the January Term (colloquially called "J-Term"), students are afforded the opportunity to take intensive study courses on the Randolph–Macon campus, travel the globe as part of a study-abroad course, or participate in professional internships in their field(s) of study and interest.

Four-year degree guarantee 
In 2011, Randolph–Macon announced a four-year degree guarantee program. The college guarantees that entering freshmen will graduate in four calendar years and, if qualifying students are not able to meet that requirement, then Randolph–Macon College will waive tuition costs for the courses that the student needs to complete their degree.

Facilities 

Randolph–Macon College has over 60 academic, administrative, athletic, and residential buildings on its campus of  located in the heart of Ashland, Virginia.  The oldest building is Washington-Franklin Hall, built in 1872, soon after the college moved to Ashland from Boydton.  It was the first brick building in Ashland, and its construction was funded by the students.  Renovated in 1987, Washington-Franklin Hall now houses the history department.  Pace-Armistead Hall was built in 1876 (renovated 1997) and originally housed the chemistry department.  Today, it is home to the studio art department, including the Flippo Art Gallery.  The original Duncan Methodist Church was built in 1879 and was renovated to include classrooms and offices for the music and arts departments.  All three buildings are listed on the National Register of Historic Places, and collectively they make up "Historic Campus."

Copley Science Center is the largest academic building on campus.  The biology, chemistry, physics/astrophysics, environmental studies, computer science, and mathematics departments are all located in Copley.  Copley Science Center was built as an extension of Smithey Hall, which today houses the psychology department.  Just north of Copley is Keeble Observatory, which includes a 12" Cassegrain reflector optical telescope, and two radio telescopes.

Randolph–Macon has one main library: McGraw-Page Library.  Formerly, the library was located in Peele Hall, which is now the main administrative building on-campus and includes the Copy Center, Registrar's Office, Human Resources, provost, dean of students, and the president.

There are 12 residence halls on campus.  The seven halls on the north end of campus are collectively known as the Freshman Village.  About 75% of the college's freshmen live in one of those halls.  The four located near the center of campus house upperclassmen and the remaining freshmen.  These include the two oldest residence halls – Thomas Branch Hall and Mary Branch Hall.  The college also owns most of the fraternity and sorority houses, other houses devoted to special interest groups, and on-campus townhouses (usually reserved for seniors). Andrews Hall, named after former dean of students Rev. Ira Andrews, opened in fall 2011. The newest residence hall, Birdsong Hall, named for Constance and Thomas Birdsong '49, opened in fall 2014. Birdsong Hall provides housing for upperclassmen, including common areas, study rooms, and laundry facilities.

The college announced a $100 million capital campaign in 2011.  A large portion of the funds will go toward enhancing facilities, including two new residence halls, new football and baseball fields and stadiums, additions and renovations to the McGraw-Page Library and Copley Science Center, along with the destruction of the Brown Campus Center that was rebuilt into the Brock Commons in 2013.

In 2021, ground was broken on Duke Hall, a new 45,000-square-foot facility which will house team locker rooms, coaches offices, a new press box, and a floor fully dedicated to the Physician Assistant graduate program, scheduled to begin accepting application in the spring of 2022. Projected opening of Duke Hall, located adjacent to the home side of Day Field, is in the autumn of 2022.

The main north–south railroad line for the east coast runs through the campus.  Most of the campus is located to the east of the railroad, but a handful of college offices, special interest houses, and athletic fields are located to the west of the tracks.  The Ashland train station (not part of the R-MC campus) is directly across from the southern entrance to the campus.

Athletics 

Randolph–Macon athletic teams are the Yellow Jackets (or more simply, as "The Jackets"). The college is a member of the Division III level of the National Collegiate Athletic Association (NCAA), primarily competing in the Old Dominion Athletic Conference (ODAC) since the 1976–77 academic year.

Randolph–Macon competes in 20 intercollegiate varsity sports: Men's sports include baseball, basketball, football, golf, lacrosse, soccer, swimming, tennis and volleyball (which was added in 2019); while women's sports include basketball, field hockey, golf, lacrosse, soccer, softball, swimming, tennis and volleyball; and co-ed sports include dance/cheer and equestrian.

The Hampden–Sydney vs. Randolph–Macon rivalry is a sports rivalry between the Hampden–Sydney College Tigers and the Randolph–Macon College Yellow Jackets. The college football rivalry between the NCAA Division III schools, often known simply as "The Game", dates to 1893 and has been called the oldest small-school rivalry in the Southern United States. The rivalry now crosses all sports, with the men's basketball series in particular gaining national attention.

On November 24, 2020, the 1984 football victory over Hampden–Sydney was voted the greatest football game in the history of Randolph–Macon dating back to 1891.  In this game, Randolph–Macon's defense forced five turnovers which allowed the explosive and record breaking offense to score 31 points in a 31–10 victory. This allowed Randolph–Macon to advance to the NCAA playoffs for the first time in the school's history finishing the regular season ranked #5 in the NCAA and #1 in the NCAA South Region.  During this historic season, Randolph Macon wide receiver Keith Gilliam had an NCAA record of nine consecutive receptions for touchdowns.

On March 19, 2022, Randolph–Macon won its first national title in the school's history as the men's basketball team soundly defeated Elmhurst College, 75–45. The Yellow Jackets set a school record for wins and finished with a 33–1 record, including a 19–0 finish in ODAC conference play.

The college maintains a Hall of Fame of former especially accomplished athletes based upon their past athletic records.

Notable alumni

Benjamin Lee Arnold (1862), American academic and the second president of Oregon State University.
Ted Bell, American author of suspense novels such as Hawke and Assassin, Pirate, Spy, Warlord, Phantom, and Overkill. Before becoming a novelist, he was president and chief creative officer of the Leo Burnett Company in Chicago; later vice-chairman of the board and worldwide creative director of Young & Rubicam, one of the world's largest advertising agencies
Michael Breed, host of The Golf Fix
Marty Brennaman, broadcaster for the Cincinnati Reds
Larry Preston Bryant, Jr. (1986), member of the Virginia House of Delegates who served as Secretary of Natural Resources under Governor Tim Kaine 
Thomas H. Campbell (1841), served in both houses of the General Assembly of Virginia, and was president of the Southside Railroad Company
William Duval Cardwell, Virginia politician. He represented Hanover County in the Virginia House of Delegates, and served as that body's Speaker from 1906 until 1908
James Rives Childs (1912) was an American consular and diplomatic official for over 30 years, a writer, and an authority on Giacomo Casanova.
Seth Clabough,  American novelist, English professor
David Clopton (1840), U.S. Congressman from Alabama, and associate justice of the Alabama Supreme Court
 John W. Craine Jr., president of SUNY Maritime College
 Nathan Davis, head men's basketball coach at Bucknell University
Lemuel Whitley Diggs, pathologist who specialized in sickle cell anemia and hematology. In 1938 he helped create in Memphis the first blood bank in the South, only the fourth in the US. He helped Danny Thomas create the St. Jude Children's Research Hospital, also in Memphis, in 1962.
James Ferguson Dowdell (1840), second president of the East Alabama College, now known as Auburn University, from 1868 to 1870, and representative from Alabama to the United States Congress
Patrick Henry Drewry (1896), U.S. Representative and state legislator from Virginia
Beth Dunkenberger (1988), head coach of the Virginia Tech women's basketball team
Brigadier General (retired) Malinda E. Dunn (1978), executive director of the American Inns of Court Foundation. United States Army Judge Advocate General's Corps, serving as the assistant Judge Advocate General for Military Law and Operations. Commanded the U.S. Army Legal Services Agency and served as chief judge of the Army Court of Criminal Appeals. First female staff judge advocate of the 82nd Airborne Division, first female chief of personnel for the Army JAG Corps, first female staff judge advocate of the 18th Airborne Corps, and first woman selected as a general officer in the active duty Army Judge Advocate General's Corps.
Randy Forbes (1974) U.S. Congressman from Virginia
 John H. Gibbons (1949), American scientist and nuclear physicist, director of the White House Office of Science and Technology Policy under President Bill Clinton
William Conrad Gibbons (1949), American historian and foreign policy expert
Meta Glass, president of Sweet Briar College
Porter Hardy Jr. (1922), U.S. Representative from Virginia.
Joseph Chappell Hutcheson, Sr. (1861), Texas politician and a Democratic member of the Texas House of Representatives and the United States House of Representatives.
Edwin L. James (1909), journalist and war correspondent who covered World War I for The New York Times
Thomas Jordan Jarvis (1861), 44th Governor of the U.S. state of North Carolina from 1879 to 1885. Jarvis later served as a U.S. Senator from 1894 to 1895, and helped establish East Carolina Teachers Training School, now known as East Carolina University, in 1907.
 Mitchell Johnson (1986), American painter
Thomas C. Johnson (1842), member of Missouri State Legislature and fourth President of Randolph-Macon College
S. Chris Jones (1980), member of the Virginia House of Delegates. In 2014, he was named chair of the House Appropriations Committee.
George Preston Marshall, founder and first owner of the NFL Washington Redskins
Gregg Marshall (1985), head men's basketball coach at Wichita State
David W. Marsden (1970), member of the Virginia Senate from the 37th district
William Alphonso Murrill (1889), American mycologist, known for his contributions to the knowledge of the Agaricales and Polyporaceae
Holland Nimmons McTyeire (1844), American Bishop of the Methodist Episcopal Church, South and a co-founder of Vanderbilt University in Nashville, Tennessee
Walter Hines Page, journalist, U.S. Ambassador to the United Kingdom
Brian Partlow, head coach of the Arena Football League's Austin Wranglers
James L. Pierce (1840), president of Lagrange (Georgia) Female College
E. Barrett Prettyman (1910), United States Federal Judge after whom the federal courthouse in Washington, D.C., is named.
Thomas G. Pullen,  fifth president of the University of Baltimore.
Margaret Bevans Ransone (1992), American politician elected to the Virginia House of Delegates in 2011
James Williams Riddleberger (1924) U.S. Ambassador to Greece
William McKendree Robbins (1850), U.S. Representative from North Carolina.
James I. Robertson Jr., author and scholar on the American Civil War and a professor at Virginia Tech
Jim Sanborn (1968), American sculptor, created the unsolved sculpture Kryptos in 1990
Hugh Scott, Republican U.S. Congressman, U.S. Senator from Pennsylvania
Matt Shaheen, Republican member of the Texas House of Representatives from Plano, Texas
Andrew Sledd, first president of the University of Florida, noted New Testament scholar at the Candler School of Theology
 Greg Smith, a child prodigy who attended the college at age 10.
Howard Stevens, professional football player
Claude A. Swanson, U.S. Senator, Governor of Virginia, U.S. Secretary of the Navy under President Franklin D. Roosevelt
Walter Leak Steele, U.S. Congressman
Nader Talebzadeh, film director
David W. Taylor (1881), rear admiral, U.S. Navy, and Chief Constructor of the Navy during World War I.
Syd Thrift, Major League Baseball player, scout, and general manager
Rev. Edward Wadsworth (1841), president of LaGrange University in Alabama from 1847 to 1852. President of the Southern University in Greensboro. In 1872, he was involved in obtaining the charter of the Methodist college that later became Vanderbilt University
Joshua Soule Zimmerman (1892), American lawyer, politician, and orchardist in the U.S. state of West Virginia. In the early years of the 20th century, Zimmerman served as the Prosecuting Attorney for Hampshire County and as a Democratic member of the West Virginia House of Delegates.

Notable faculty
Dave Brat: former Republican Congressman for Virginia's 7th congressional district U.S. House of Representatives seat. In 2014, he defeated House Majority Leader Eric Cantor in the GOP primary and went on to defeat Democratic candidate Jack Trammell (also a member of the faculty) in the November general election. In 2018, he was defeated by Democratic candidate Abigail Spanberger
William E. Dodd, American Ambassador to Germany 1933-1937
David Seth Doggett, a professor in the 1860s and later a bishop of the Methodist Episcopal Church, South
Theodore Henley Jack, president of Randolph-Macon College from 1933 through 1964
Nathaniel Thomas Lupton (1830–1893), a professor of chemistry in 1856
Debra Rodman, associate professor of anthropology and women's studies and director of Women's Studies and elected to the Virginia House of Delegates in November 2017 for District 73
 Jack Trammell, the 2014 Democratic candidate for the U.S. House of Representatives in Virginia's 7th congressional district
Seth Clabough,  American novelist, English professor

References

External links

Official website
Official athletics website

 
Liberal arts colleges in Virginia
Private universities and colleges in Virginia
University and college buildings on the National Register of Historic Places in Virginia
National Register of Historic Places in Hanover County, Virginia
Educational institutions established in 1830
Education in Hanover County, Virginia
Universities and colleges accredited by the Southern Association of Colleges and Schools
Buildings and structures in Hanover County, Virginia
Tourist attractions in Hanover County, Virginia
Gothic Revival architecture in Virginia
Italianate architecture in Virginia
1830 establishments in Virginia